Terrol Dew Johnson (born 1973) is a Tohono O'odham basket weaver, sculptor, and health advocate, who promotes Indigenous foods to prevent diabetes.

Background
Terrol Dew Johnson is Tohono O'odham from Sells, Arizona. Johnson began weaving at the age of ten. "It was the only thing I was good at," the artist has been quoted as saying, "I've always been touchy-feely and good with my hands—I could do this with my hands, and it was fun!" His parents, particularly his mother Betty Ann Pancho, actively encouraged his interest in basketry

Basketry
Johnson uses plant materials historically used by his tribe in his work in experimental weaves, forms, and techniques. One of his pieces, Quilt Basket, is a virtuoso display of different weaving techniques, suspended from a single branch. His materials include bear grass, yucca, devil's claw, and gourds.

In 2016, Johnson collaborated with the Aranda\Lasch architectural studio on an installation at the Tucson Museum of Contemporary Art entitled "Meeting the Clouds Halfway," which combined traditional designs using natural desert materials with computer-generated patterns.

Johnson has won major top awards at Santa Fe Indian Market, O'odham Tash (the Tohono O'odham annual festival held in February), the Heard Museum Guild Fair, and the Southwest Museum's Indian Art Fair.

Tohono O'odham Community Action
With his business partner Tristan Reader, Terrol Johnson founded Tohono O'odham Community Action (TOCA) in 1996. The nonprofit community development organization operates a basketry cooperative, farms, and sells indigenous foods. Tohono O'odham people have the highest rate of adult-onset diabetes of any ethnic group in the world. TOCA's Tohono O'odham Community Food System provided tribal members with aboriginal desert foods to combat the disease and promote health and sustainability. Foods provided by TOCA include tepary beans, mesquite beans, cholla (cactus) buds, chia seeds, squashes, acorns, and saguaro cactus fruit and syrup.

TOCA has received widespread recognition. For his efforts with TOCA, Johnson was named one of the top ten community leaders in 1999 by the Do Something organization. The US President's Committee on the Arts and Humanities gave TOCA the Coming Up Taller Award in 2001. In 2002, both Johnson and Reader won the Ford Foundation's Leadership for a Changing World Award.

In 2011, Johnson was named a White House Food Security "Champion of Change" for his work renewing indigenous food sovereignty.

"The Walk Home"
For two years, Terrol Dew Johnson traveled on a "journey of the heart," a 3000-mile walk across the country with his teenage relatives. Stopping at native communities to discuss health and culture, "The Walk Home" has celebrated aboriginal native foods and health. "The Walk Home" arrived home on March 20, 2010.

Native Foodways Magazine 
In 2013, TOCA launched a national magazine covering the community organizing, culinary innovation, and cultural significance of Native American foods. Johnson is the publisher and a significant contributor to the production of the magazine. The magazine and its Facebook page have been central to the Native Food Sovereignty movement, of which Johnson is a part. He is a founding board member of the Native American Food Sovereignty Alliance (NAFSA).

References

External links

Terrol Dew Johnson, official site
Native Foodways Magazine Facebook page
NAFSA Facebook Page
TOCA-Tohono O'odham Community Action
Terrol Dew Johnson White House "Champion of Change"

1973 births
Native American basket weavers
Tohono O'odham people
American health activists
Living people
20th-century Native Americans
21st-century Native Americans
Native American people from Arizona